Sol Moore, also called "Pee Wee Moore", was an American jazz musician who played with Dizzy Gillespie, the Jeter-Pillars Orchestra, recorded with Floyd Ray late in the 1930s, and worked with Gillespie in the Les Hite big band in 1939-42 before recording with Gilliespie's ensemble in 1946-47.

References

American male jazz musicians